Khao Yai National Park is a national park in Thailand. Established in 1962 as Thailand's first national park, it is the third largest national park in Thailand.

Description
Khao Yai National Park is in the western part of the Sankamphaeng Mountain Range, at the southwestern boundary of the Khorat Plateau.
This park lies largely in Nakhon Ratchasima Province (Khorat), but also includes parts of Saraburi, Prachinburi and Nakhon Nayok Provinces.

The park is the third largest in Thailand. It covers an area of 1,353,472 rai ~ , including tropical seasonal forests and grasslands. There are 3,000 species of plants, 320 species of birds such as red junglefowl and coral-billed ground cuckoo, and 66 species of mammals, including Asian black bear, Indian elephant, gaur, gibbon, Indian sambar deer, southern pig-tailed macaque, Indian muntjac, Ussuri dhole and wild pigs. There have been are no tigers in Khao Yai for at least 20 years. Its waterfalls include the  Heo Narok (เหวนรก), and Heo Suwat (หวสุวัต) made famous by the film The Beach.

Recent wildlife studies show that animal ranges, particularly the few resident tigers, are impacted by human activity near the centre of the park.

History
Around 1922 some people from Ban Tha Dan and Ban Tha Chai villages in Nakhon Nayok Province built a settlement within the forest in the Sankamphaeng mountains. Up to 30 households cultivated the land. The area was formally recognized by the government and classified as Tambon Khao Yai within Pak Phli District.

Due to its remoteness from the authorities it became a refuge for criminals and fugitives. After an attempt to capture the suspects in the area, in 1932 the villagers were relocated into the plains some 30 km away and the tambon status was cancelled.

In 1959 the prime minister, Field Marshal Sarit Thanarat, instructed the Ministry of Agriculture and the Ministry of the Interior to create a process whereby national parks could be established.

Khao Yai National Park was then established on 18 September 1962, declared by royal proclamation in the Government Gazette (Book 79, Section 89) as the first national park in Thailand. A major role in its establishment was played by Boonsong Lekakul, one of the 20th century's most famous Thai conservationists. It was named after the defunct tambon, Khao Yai.

In 1984 the park was made an ASEAN Heritage Park, and on 14 July 2005 the park, together with other parks in the same range and in the Dong Phaya Yen Mountains further north, was proclaimed a UNESCO World Heritage Site under the name "Dong Phaya Yen–Khao Yai Forest Complex". As the lands adjacent to the national park are becoming increasingly developed into luxury hotels and golf courses, acquiring land for future wildlife conservation efforts is becoming problematic. Homes and residential villas have been built illegally within the limits of the protected area of the forest. Illegal logging is also a problem in the area of the park.

Key mountains

Khao Rom (เขาร่ม)
Khao Rom is the highest mountain in Khao Yai National Park, measuring up to 1,351 meters above sea level.

Reaching the peak of the mountain is only accessible on foot, which few people attempt to, except for forestry officers

Khao Laem (เขาแหลม)
Since this mountain is spiral shaped, it is called Khao Laem (เขาแหลม; Lit: Spiky Mountain). Khao Laem is the park's 2nd highest mountain, the highest being Khao Rom.

Similar to Khao Rom, reaching the peak of the mountain is also only possible on foot. Reaching the peak of the mountain takes no less than 7 hours. Before reaching the absolute summit, one must also climb up a rope.

With such difficult challenges climbing the mountain, The Lottery Club once awarded a 60,000 baht prize to a woman who would conquer the summit of the peak. The recipient of the award, Catherine B. Buri, conquered the summit in 1972.

The path used to travel to the summit of the mountain is also used as a wildlife corridor by animals, therefore many animal tracks are found here. Ascending the mountain also affords the opportunity of seeing various forms of wildlife.

Tourist attractions

Haew Narok Waterfall (น้ำตกเหวนรก)
Haew Narok is a waterfall formed from Tha Dan canal. It is known as one of the tallest and most beautiful waterfalls of Khao Yai National Park. Originally, before the Prachin Buri - Khao Yai road was cut, it is only accessible on foot and would take at least 6 hours to make it there, but after the finishing of the Prachin Buri - Khao Yai road, it is easily accessible by cars since the road passes near Haew Narok Waterfall. There is a parking lot just 1 kilometer away from the waterfall. Upon reaching the waterfall, there is a staircase going down about 50 meters, which is quite narrow and steep. 

In the rainy season, there will be a lot of rain water but in the dry season, there will be few to no water falling down the cliff.

Pha Kluai Mai Waterfall (น้ำตกผากล้วยไม้)
Pha Kluai Mai Waterfall gets its water source from Huai Lam Takhong.

To get there, you have to park your car at Pha Kluai Mai tent yard and walk on.

The waterfall gets its name from the abundance of orchids present there.

Haew Su Wat Waterfall (น้ำตกเหวสุวัต)
This waterfall gets its source from the Huai Lam Takhong flowing through a 25 meter high cliff. The basin of the waterfall is suitable for swimming, however, the national park prohibits swimming due to fear of turbulent flood waters.

In the rainy season, the falling water will make a scattered mist of water vapor. In the dry season, the waterfall will recede, revealing a shortcut into a small cave under the waterfall cliff.

One urban legend reports that Haew Su Wat was named after a thief named Suwat who, in order escape government authority, jumped into the basin. However, there's no verifiable proof of this actually happening so the origin of the name is currently unknown.

Visitors
According to the Department of National Parks (DNP), which manages the park, visitors to Khao Yai have risen from 671,569 in 2008 to more than 1.2 million in FY2016. From October 2015 to September 2016, 471,514 vehicles entered the park. The congestion has led to demands to close the park to private vehicles. During one of its busiest periods, New Year's week from 30 December – 3 January 2016, the park received 156,574 visitors. They left in excess of 23 tonnes of waste behind. As litter was a serious problem at the park, in 2020 the park started mailing litter to the homes of visitors who left it there.

Climate

Khao Yai National Park has three main seasons, with an annual mean temperature of 23° Celsius, though this varies greatly with the seasons.

Rainy season (May–October): Most days have high rates of precipitation. The atmosphere is humid with average temperatures of 27 °C during the day dropping to 13 °C at night. Streams at peak flow.
Cool season (November–February): Clear skies, sunny and cool. Average temperatures of 22 °C during the day and 10 °C at night. Good time for hiking.
Hot season (March–April): Humid with daytime temperatures of 20–30 °C and 17 °C at night.

Geology

Limestone is present towards the eastern end close to the Dângrêk Mountains. Sandstone outcrops exist in the south and north of the park. Shales and schist are also present. In the south, steep slopes made of granite and conglomerates are seen.

Drainage
There are four drainage areas in the park which are vital catchments for four river systems. The Lam Takhong River drains from the central Khao Yai area and runs in a northeasterly direction to the Mekong. The Sai Yai River system drains from the eastern basin, turning sharply into the southern floodplains and on to the Gulf of Thailand. The Nakhon Nayok River system drains from the southwest watershed into Nakhon Nayok Province to the south. The Saraburi Province drainage system drains westward from the far west of Khao Yai.

Fauna
Khao Yai is home to a variety of animals. It is one of the few places in Thailand where wild elephants still survive. They are regularly seen and are a major tourist attraction. Other larger animals include gibbons, pig-tailed macaques, muntjacs and sambar deer. Other large animals include barking deer, porcupine, and civet. Other species that can occasionally be seen include sun bear, Asian black bear, gaur, otter, dhole and jackal. 

In early-2017 it was announced that 18 tigers, including five males, seven female and six cubs, were filmed by surveillance cameras in the Dong Phaya Yen-Khao Yai world heritage site in June 2016 and February 2017 in a joint effort of the Department of National Parks, the Freeland Foundation, and the Panthera Corporation. The last time that tigers were seen by surveillance cameras in Khao Yai National Park was in 2002.

Tribute
On 18 September 2017, Google celebrated the 55th anniversary of Khao Yai National Park with a Google Doodle.

See also

Dong Phayayen - Khao Yai Forest Complex
Sankamphaeng Range
List of national parks of Thailand
List of Protected Areas Regional Offices of Thailand

References

External links

National Park Division
Mammals, birds and reptiles of Khao Yai National Park
thaibirding.com on Khao Yai National Park
List of Birds of Khao Yai National Park

National parks of Thailand
ASEAN heritage parks
World Heritage Sites in Thailand
Isan
Tourist attractions in Nakhon Ratchasima province
Tourist attractions in Saraburi province
Tourist attractions in Prachinburi province
Tourist attractions in Nakhon Nayok province
Protected areas established in 1962
1962 establishments in Thailand
Sankamphaeng Range